"Season of the Hexenbiest" is the 12th episode and mid-season finale of the supernatural drama television series Grimm of season 2 and the 34th overall, which premiered on November 16, 2012, on NBC. The episode was written by series creators Jim Kouf and David Greenwalt from a story by Kouf, and was directed by Karen Gaviola.

Plot
Opening quote: "Oh! There is a terrible witch in that house who spewed her poison over me and scratched me with her long fingernails."

Monroe (Silas Weir Mitchell) sees Renard (Sasha Roiz) and Juliette (Bitsie Tulloch) kissing. When Juliette sees him, she leaves. Two Hundjägers from the Verrat in motorcycles watch them and report it to Adalind (Claire Coffee), who has returned from Vienna.

Monroe tells Nick (David Giuntoli) that Juliette kissed a man but as he doesn't know Renard, he can't identify him. Nick confronts Juliette with this, but she states that nothing else happened between her and Renard. Hank (Russell Hornsby) is then visited by Adalind and after turning her down is attacked by two Hundjägers and sent to the hospital. He tells Nick of Adalind and that she wants to know who killed her mother.

Adalind calls Renard to inform him that she now is affiliated with the Verrat and demands that he give her the key or she will tell Nick about Renard's real identity. Adalind visits Juliette and they go to a coffee shop to talk about Nick and to find the location of the trailer. Nick calls Juliette and discovers she is with Adalind and sends a group of police officers to arrest her under the suspicion of killing her mother, upsetting Juliette that Nick used her. In fact, Adalind planned on getting arrested, insisting it is "safer".

Adalind gives her hotel room address and Monroe "accidentally" sneaks into the room to find out who else is there, and finds four Hundjägers of the Verrat inside. He lures them to a field where Nick uses a Kanabo (a resemblance of a bat) to kill two of them and demands a girl to reveal their boss in Portland but she is killed by the last Hundjäger. Nick and Monroe dispose of the evidence in an attempt to clear themselves.

Nick confronts Adalind and she states that he will get the name of the boss if he turns over the key. Unable to live with Juliette, Nick moves in with Monroe where Monroe tells him that he saw the person who was making out with Juliette in a television report. Nick is shocked when he discovers the man is Renard. Meanwhile, Renard has discovered the location of the trailer, looking for the key.

The episode ends with the statement: "To be continued … Sorry."

Reception

Viewers
The episode was viewed by 5.03 million people, earning a 1.6/5 in the 18-49 rating demographics on the Nielson ratings scale, ranking second on its timeslot and third for the night in the 18-49 demographics, behind Undercover Boss, and Shark Tank. This was an 8% decrease in viewership from the previous episode, which was watched by 5.21 million viewers with a 1.7/5. This means that 1.6 percent of all households with televisions watched the episode, while 5 percent of all households watching television at that time watched it. With DVR factoring in, the episode was watched by 8.00 million viewers with a 2.8 ratings share in the 18-49 demographics.

Critical reviews
"Season of the Hexenbiest" received mostly positive reviews. The A.V. Club's Les Chappell gave the episode a "A" grade and wrote, "That all changes in 'Season Of The Hexenbiest' however, an outing that's firmly grounded in the larger world of the show. It presents the return of the mysterious key that Nick's mother promised was part of a larger puzzle dating back to the Crusades, the Verrat's merciless Hundjäger enforcers and the most direct involvement by the Seven Houses in Portland events to date. And perhaps not coincidentally, it also happens to be the best episode the show's done all season ('La Llorona' being a close second), an episode that uses this larger world as an impetus to push several characters out of their holding patterns, where things are said and seen which no one can take back."

Nick McHatton from TV Fanatic, gave a 4.8 star rating out of 5, stating: "'Season of the Hexenbiest' finally brought Nick's line of focus to the man just below his Grimm world: Renard. Of course, this is still Grimm we're talking about, and Nick is still in the dark when it comes Renard's royal blood. But Nick won't let up until he knows exactly what kind of man Renard is because Renard is the person Nick can place blame on for his continually caving personal life."

Shilo Adams from TV Overmind, wrote: "We pick up with where we ended the last episode of Grimm: Renard and Juliette locking lips in the spice shop, but once she sees Monroe, she hightails it to her car and heads home. In addition to her vehicle and Renard's vehicle, both on the road and going different directions, we see two black-clad figures on motorcycles, each with double diamond symbols on their hands. They work for Adalind Schade, the (former?) Hexenbiest that has been a thorn in Nick's paw since the third episode of the series; she had them, a brunette female and a blonde-ish male with longer hair, stalking the Captain in order to gather information on his obsession with Juliette."

Josie Campbell from TV.com wrote, "'Season of the Hexenbiest' was so much better than the last handful of filler episodes, in fact, that I wonder if Grimm is a show that could benefit from a shorter, cable-style season, focusing on a fast-paced and twisty 13 episodes rather than a slow and drawn-out 22 or 24. I, for one, would be willing to sacrifice some of the episodic Wesen-of-the-Week plots to focus more on the Royals vs. the Grimms."

References

External links
 

Grimm (season 2) episodes
2012 American television episodes
Television episodes written by David Greenwalt